Kossel is the surname of the following notable people:

Albrecht Kossel (1853–1927), German biochemist and Nobel laureate
Walther Kossel (1888–1956), German physicist, son of Albrecht